Saraiya Bhoor is a village in Baira Khanpur Gram panchayat in Bilhaur Tehsil, Kanpur Nagar district, Uttar Pradesh, India. According to 2011 Census of India the total population of the village is 903.

References

Villages in Kanpur Nagar district